Pogiri is a village and panchayat in Rajam mandal of Srikakulam district, Andhra Pradesh, India.

References

 http://www.census2011.co.in/data/village/581333-pogiri-andhra-pradesh.html

Villages in Srikakulam district